"Don't Forget Who You Are" is a song by the English musician Miles Kane from his second studio album Don't Forget Who You Are. It was released on 3 June 2013 as a Digital download in the United Kingdom.  Its B-side, "Get Right", was co-written by Arctic Monkeys frontman Alex Turner, who played bass guitar on the song.  The song is featured on the EA Sports video game, FIFA 14.

Track listing

Personnel
Miles Kane - lead vocals, guitar
Ian Broudie - keyboards, backing vocals
Martyn Campbell - bass guitar
Sean Payne - drums
Chris Balin, Juliet Roberts, Sylvia Mason-James - backing vocals
George Moran - backing vocals on "Get Right"
Ben Parsons - keyboards on "Get Right"
Alex Turner - bass guitar on "Get Right"
Pete Thomas - drums, percussion on "Get Right"

References

2013 singles
Songs written by Ian Broudie
2013 songs
Sony Music singles
Songs written by Miles Kane
Song recordings produced by Ian Broudie